The 2006 United States House of Representatives elections in Kansas were held on November 4, 2006 to determine who will represent the state of Kansas in the United States House of Representatives. Kansas has four seats in the House, apportioned according to the 2000 United States Census. Representatives are elected for two-year terms. , this was the last time Democrats won more than one House seat in Kansas.

Overview

District 1 

 

Incumbent Republican Jerry Moran defeated Democrat John Doll, a history professor. This district covers the western part of the state.

District 2 

 

Incumbent Republican Jim Ryun lost re-election to Democrat Nancy Boyda, a chemist. The district covers the eastern part of the state.

District 3 

 

Incumbent Democrat Dennis Moore defeated Republican Chuck Ahner, a businessman. The district covers the Metro Kansas City area.

District 4 

 

Incumbent Republican Todd Tiahrt defeated Democrat Garth McGinn. This district covers the metro Wichita area.

References 

2006 Kansas elections
Kansas

2006